is a professional Japanese baseball player. He plays pitcher for the Orix Buffaloes.

Professional career
In 2021, after posting a 13-4 record and 131 strikeouts in 147.2 innings pitched, Miyagi won the NPB Pacific League Rookie of the year award and was named an NPB All-Star for the first time. His 2.51 ERA was second in the Pacific League only to his teammate, Yoshinobu Yamamoto.

References 

2001 births
Living people
Baseball people from Okinawa Prefecture
Japanese baseball players
Nippon Professional Baseball pitchers
Orix Buffaloes players
Nippon Professional Baseball Rookie of the Year Award winners
2023 World Baseball Classic players